Miguel Artola Gallego (12 July 1923 – 26 May 2020) was a Spanish intellectual and historian.  He was born in San Sebastián, and died, aged 96, in Madrid.

Artola Gallego was elected to medalla nº 34 of the Real Academia de la Historia on 20 March 1981 and took up his seat on 2 May 1982.

Achievements and awards 

 Doctorate honoris causa at the University of the Basque Country in 1989.
 Prince of Asturias Award for social sciences in 1991.
 Doctorate honoris causa at the University of Salamanca in 1992.
 Premio Nacional de Historia de España in 1992 for Encyclopédie d'histoire espagnole.
 Medal of the Autonomous University of Madrid in 1993.
 Grand Cross in the Civil Order of Alfonso X, the Wise in 1996.
 Premium “Eusko Ikaskuntza-Caja Laboral de Humanidades, Cultura, Artes y Ciencias Sociales” in 2000.
 Premium “Nacional de Humanidades Lorenzana” in 2008.

Publications 
 Partidos y programas políticos Alianza Editorial, S.A.  [Complete oeuvre]
 Enciclopedia de historia de España Alianza Editorial, S.A.  [Complete oeuvre]
 Historia de España Alianza Editorial, S.A.  [Complete oeuvre]
 La burguesía revolucionaria (1808-1874) Alianza Editorial, S.A., 2001.  [Volume 5]
 La España de Fernando VII: la guerra de la Independencia y los orígenes del régimen constitucional Espasa-Calpe, S.A., 1999.  [Volume 32]
 Los afrancesados Alianza Editorial, S.A., 1989. 
 Antiguo régimen y revolución liberal Editorial Ariel, S.A., 1991. 
 Los derechos del hombre Alianza Editorial, S.A., 1987. 
 Los Ferrocarriles en España 1844-1943 Banco de España, 1978. 
 La hacienda del Antiguo Régimen Alianza Editorial, S.A., 1982. 
 La hacienda del siglo XIX: progresistas y moderados Alianza Editorial, S.A., 1986. 
 Latifundio Propiedad y Explotación. Siglo XVIII Ministerio de Agricultura, Pesca y Alimentación. Centro de Publicaciones, 1978. 
 El modelo constitucional Español del siglo XIX Fundación Juan March, 1979. 
 Los Orígenes de la España contemporánea (Tomo 1) Centro de Estudios Políticos y Constitucionales, 1975. 
 Los Orígenes de la España contemporánea (Tomo 2) Centro de Estudios Políticos y Constitucionales, 1975. 
 Partidos y programas políticos (1808-1936). (Tomo 1) Aguilar, S.A. d'Ediciones-Grupo Santillana, 1977. 
 Partidos y programas políticos (1808-1936). (Tomo 2) Aguilar, S.A. d'Ediciones-Grupo Santillana, 1977. 
 Textos fundamentales para la Historia Alianza Editorial, S.A., 1992. 
 La España de Fernando VII Espasa-Calpe, S.A., 1999. 
 La monarquía de España Alianza Editorial, S.A., 1999. 
 Vidas en tiempo de crisis Real Academia de la Historia, 1999. 
 Los orígenes de la España contemporánea Centro de Estudios Políticos y Constitucionales.  [Œuvre complète]
 Las Cortes de Cádiz Marcial Pons, Ediciones de Historia, S.A., 2003.

References 
 This article is party translated from the Spanish Wikipedia page. See attribution there.

External links
Miguel Artola Gallego at Dialnet

Members of the Real Academia de la Historia
Academic staff of the Autonomous University of Madrid
Academic staff of the University of Salamanca
20th-century Spanish historians
1923 births
2020 deaths